Miss Teen USA 2001, the 19th Miss Teen USA pageant, was televised live from South Padre Convention Island Center, South Padre Island, Texas on 22 August 2001. At the conclusion of the final competition, Marissa Whitley of Missouri was crowned by outgoing queen Jillian Parry of Pennsylvania.

Host city
After hosting the pageant for three consecutive years from 1998 to 2000, officials in Shreveport, Louisiana indicated that they were reluctant to host the pageant for a fourth year because disorganization by the Miss Universe Organization meant that the city lost over $70,000 in expected revenue.

Results

Placements

Special awards

Final competition score

There was a tie (9.32) between Massachusetts and California, but the judges voted for Massachusetts to advance to top five.

Delegates
The Miss Teen USA 2001 delegates were:

  Alabama - Rollins Albritton
  Alaska - Danielle Smith
  Arizona - Eva Marie St. Arnauld
  Arkansas - Lauren Arnold
  California - Casey McClain
  Colorado - Krystal Spurr
  Connecticut - Marie Lynn Piscitelli
  Delaware - Christie Aiken
  District of Columbia - Jacqueline Drakeford
  Florida - Joanna Candelaria
  Georgia - Brandy Drake
  Hawaii - Alana Paulo-Tamashiro
  Idaho - Hayley Vancleave
  Illinois - Brittany Richmond
  Indiana - Jillian Dornbush
  Iowa - Ashley Hanson
  Kansas - Lindsey Mackey
  Kentucky - Katherine Faulkner
  Louisiana - Paige Egan
  Maine - Mei-Ling Lam
  Maryland - Precious Grady
  Massachusetts - Marianna Zaslavsky
  Michigan - Chelsea Rudder
  Minnesota - Serene Aandahl
  Mississippi - Ashley Buckman
  Missouri - Marissa Whitley
  Montana - Kristi Krings
  Nebraska - Heidi Lammli
  Nevada - Tahnee Harrison
  New Hampshire - Ashley Lynne Blair
  New Jersey - Erin Abrahamson
  New Mexico - Alaina Castillo
  New York - Gloria Almonte
  North Carolina - Erin O'Kelley
  North Dakota - Stacey Thomas
  Ohio - Angela Wilson
  Oklahoma - Lindsey Camp
  Oregon - Sarah Warner
  Pennsylvania - Rebecca Schlappich
  Rhode Island - Amy Diaz
  South Carolina - Sarah Medley
  South Dakota - Jessica Herrgott
  Tennessee - Jessica Myers
  Texas - Katherine Perello 
  Utah - Nicole Hansen
  Vermont - Heather Moylan
  Virginia - Kathleen Lighthiser
  Washington - Shannon Hulbert
  West Virginia - Tara Szerszen
  Wisconsin - Kellyann Langford
  Wyoming - Natalie Koontz

Contestant notes
 Six contestants later won Miss USA state titles:
 Sarah Medley (South Carolina) - Miss South Carolina USA 2005
 Erin Abrahamson (New Jersey) - Miss New Jersey USA 2007, originally 1st runner-up but assumed the title after Ashley Harder announced her pregnancy and failing to follow pageant rules
 Gloria Almonte (New York) - Miss New York USA 2007, semifinalist at Miss Puerto Rico Universe 2009 
 Erin O'Kelley (North Carolina) - Miss North Carolina USA 2007, top 15 semifinalist at Miss USA 2007
 Amy Diaz (Rhode Island) - Miss Rhode Island USA 2008, top 15 semifinalist at Miss USA 2008
 Marie-Lynn Piscitelli (Connecticut) - Miss Connecticut USA 2012

Judges
 Rich Cronin
 Elisabeth Filarski
 Veronica Kay
 Ray Munns
 Kerr Smith
 Krista Stegall
 Christina Vidal

References

External links
 Official website

2001
2001 beauty pageants
2001 in the United States
2001 in Texas